Lake Muskoka South Water Aerodrome  is located on Lake Muskoka  south east of Gravenhurst, Ontario, Canada.

See also
Lake Muskoka/Dudley Bay Water Aerodrome
Lake Muskoka/Alport Bay Water Aerodrome
Lake Muskoka/Mortimer's Point Water Aerodrome

References

Registered aerodromes in Ontario
Seaplane bases in Ontario
Transport in the District Municipality of Muskoka